L 20e α was a design for a class of battleships to be built in 1918 for the German Kaiserliche Marine (Imperial Navy) during World War I. Design work on the class of battleship to succeed the s began in 1914, but the outbreak of World War I in July 1914 led to these plans being shelved. Work resumed in early 1916 and lessons from the Battle of Jutland, fought later that year, were incorporated into the design. Reinhard Scheer, the commander of the fleet, wanted larger main guns and a higher top speed than earlier vessels, to combat the latest ships in the British Royal Navy. A variety of proposals were submitted, with armament ranging from the same eight  guns of the Bayern class to eight  guns.

Work on the design was completed by September 1918, but by then there was no chance for them to be built. Germany's declining war situation and the reallocation of resources to support the U-boat campaign meant the ships would never be built.

Background

Just before the start of the 20th century, Germany embarked on a naval expansion to challenge British control of the seas, under the direction of Vizeadmiral (Vice Admiral) Alfred von Tirpitz.

Beginning before World War I broke out in July 1914, the German Kaiserliche Marine began planning for the battleship design for the 1916 construction program, which would follow the Bayern-class battleships that were then under construction. The Bayerns were armed with a main battery of  guns in four twin-gun turrets. The British had begun building the similarly-armed  and s and the Germans intended the 1916 battleship design to be superior to these and designs were drawn up with an armament of ten or twelve 38 cm guns. The designs included versions with the standard twin-gun turrets favored by the German navy, along with variants with both twin and quadruple turrets similar to the French s that had been laid down in 1913. The outbreak of war led to the abandonment of the plans.

By 1916, work had resumed on new battleship designs and, in April, the first three proposals were submitted: the L 1, L 2 and L 3 designs, which were similar to the s then also under development. The battleships were the same size as the battlecruisers and L 1 and L 3 had the same armament of eight 38 cm guns (L 2 would have mounted ten of those guns) but they would have had a top speed of  compared to the  speeds of the Ersatz Yorcks and heavier armor. Work on the designs continued at a slow pace, with thought given to armament alternatives, including batteries of eight or ten 38 cm or eight  guns.

Development and cancellation 
In January 1916, Vizeadmiral Reinhard Scheer became commander in chief of the High Seas Fleet. Following the Battle of Jutland on 31 May – 1June 1916, Scheer pushed for new, more powerful battleships, which were in concert with Kaiser Wilhelm II's call for what he referred to as the "Einheitsschiff" (unified ship) that combined the armor and firepower of battleships and the high speed of battlecruisers. Another faction in the naval command, led by Admiral Eduard von Capelle, the State Secretary of the Reichsmarineamt (RMA—Imperial Navy Office), opposed the idea and favored traditional, differentiated capital ship designs. The new 42 cm gun was designed by 29 December 1916 and was approved on 11 September 1918, though none were built.

L 20b, L 21b and L 22c; L 20b would have eight 42 cm guns, L 21b and L 22c ten or eight 38 cm guns, respectively. After the beginning of unrestricted submarine warfare in February 1917, Capelle argued that capital ship construction should not be halted in favor of U-boat construction. It also differed in the placement of the torpedo armament. The L 20 design placed them in the hull below the waterline, while the L 24 proposal used above-water launchers. Both ships had a top speed of only , which was unacceptable to Scheer.

By October 1917, the L 20e and L 24e designs were refined into the L 20e α and L 24e α versions; these displaced  and 45,000 t respectively. Secondary batteries were reduced to twelve guns, compared to the sixteen guns of the Bayern class. L 24e α also had an additional pair of torpedo tubes, mounted above the waterline, compared to L 20e α. The armor layout for both designs was similar to that of the Bayern class. The proposals were submitted to the naval command in January 1918; Wilhelm II continued to stress the importance of the "Einheitsschiff" concept and he suggested that the speed of the design might be significantly increased by removing the forward superfiring turret and the submerged torpedo tubes. By that time, the studies that had been completed suggested that the weight savings would be minimal and that the more crowded triple or quadruple turrets would reduce the rate of fire too much.

By 11 September 1918, the L 20e α variant was selected as the basis for the next battleship to be built. During the design process, it was decided that the utmost concern was that the ships could be built and placed into service quickly. The ships were to discard the use of broadside belt armor below the waterline, the attachment of which was an extremely time-consuming process. It was believed that the higher speed of the class——would make up for the vulnerability to torpedo attack and make the armor unnecessary.

The ships were never built, primarily because the shipyard capacity available that late in the war had largely been diverted to support the U-boat campaign. The work that would have been necessary to design and test the new 42 cm turret clashed with U-boat construction, which had become the priority of the Navy. Krupp, the firm that had been awarded the contract to conduct the testing, informed the RMA that design work on the new turret would have to wait and Capelle accepted the news without much objection. The RMA filed a report dated 1February 1918, which stated that capital ship construction had stopped, primarily due to the shifting priorities to the U-boat war. Though the ships of the class were never built, the naval historian Timothy Mulligan notes that with "the unresolved dilemma of conflicting design concepts and overly ambitious demands in battleship characteristics..." that the L 20 α design represented, "...the Imperial Navy bequeathed a dubious legacy to its successors".

Characteristics

General characteristics and machinery
The ships were intended to have the typical single tripod foremast mounted atop the large, forward superstructure and a lighter pole main mast aft of the funnel. The steam plant consisted of six oil-fired and sixteen coal-fired boilers trunked into a large funnel. Externally, the ships were similar to the Ersatz Yorck-class battlecruisers.

Armament 
The main battery was arranged in four twin-gun turrets, as in the preceding Bayern class, in a superfiring arrangement on the center line; the aft pair of turrets were separated by engine rooms. The four turrets each mounted two 42 cm SK L/45 guns, for a total of eight guns on the broadside. The estimated muzzle velocity was  The ships were to have been armed with a secondary battery of twelve  SK L/45 guns mounted in casemates in the main deck around the superstructure. The anti-aircraft battery was to have consisted of either eight  SK L/45 guns or eight  SK L/45 guns. Four of these would have been mounted on either side of the forward conning tower on the upper deck and the other four would have been abreast of the rear superfiring turret on the main deck. The design was to have been equipped with three submerged torpedo tubes, either  in diameter. One tube was placed in the bow, the other two on either beam to the rear of the engine rooms.

Armor 
The ships had a  armored belt running from slightly forward of the fore barbette to slightly aft of the fourth barbette. Directly above the main belt was a 250 mm thick strake of armor plating which extended up to the upper deck. The ships were also protected by a torpedo bulkhead that was 50–60 mm thick. A sloped 30 mm thick splinter bulkhead to protect against shell fragments, extended from the top of the torpedo bulkhead up to the upper deck.

The barbettes were also 350 mm thick on the front and sides, decreasing to 250 mm on the rear. The main gun turrets had 350 mm faces, 250 mm sides,  rears, and  roofs. The forward conning tower had  of armor protection and the aft conning tower received just 250 mm of side protection.

Notes

Footnotes

Citations

References 

 
 
 
 
 
 
 
 
 
 

L20
Battleship classes
Proposed ships of Germany
Battleships of the Imperial German Navy